Agusan del Norte's 1st congressional district is a congressional district for the House of Representatives of the Philippines in the province of Agusan del Norte. It is one of only two districts in the province in existence since 1987. The district covers the independent city of Butuan and its neighbor, the municipality of Las Nieves. It is currently represented in the 18th Congress by Lawrence Fortun of the Nacionalista Party (NP).

Representation history

Election results

2022

2019

2016

2013

2010

See also
Legislative districts of Agusan del Norte

References

Congressional districts of the Philippines
Politics of Agusan del Norte
1987 establishments in the Philippines
Congressional districts of Caraga
Constituencies established in 1987